Oh Tae-gon (born November 18, 1991) is the infielder of KT Wiz of the KBO League. He joined Lotte Giants in 2010. He transferred to KT Wiz in 2017. The name before renaming is 'Oh Seung-taek(오승택)'. He graduated Cheongwon High school.

References

External links 

 Oh Tae-gon on Mykbostats

Living people
1991 births
KT Wiz
Baseball players from Seoul